Gainsborough is an area of Ipswich, in the Ipswich district, in the county of Suffolk, England. It was named after the artist Thomas Gainsborough of Sudbury, who lived in Ipswich for several years. He was noted for visiting the banks of the Orwell in this area.

Gainsborough Lane

Gainsborough Estate
The estate was a public housing development whose construction was started in 1926 and continued into the 1930s. It comprises largely of two storey terraced and semi-detached dwellings. The road layout is a hybrid of both grids and spoke and wheel plan.

Gainsborough Library
In 2008-9 Suffolk County Council built a new library on the site of the previous library located in Clapgate Lane. This is a steel frame structure with decorative stainless steel circular cladding around an atrium entrance. The building won the RIBA East 'Spirit of Ingenuity'  award.

The library under construction

Gainsborough Ward

Gainsborough Ward is one of the sixteen wards which compose Ipswich Borough. It elects three councillors. The ward also includes the neighbouring area of Greenwich.

See also
Leighton Road Evangelical Church, Ipswich

References

Ipswich Districts
Housing estates in England
Gainsborough Ward, Ipswich